Stasys Jakeliūnas (born 2 October 1958) is a Lithuanian politician currently serving as a Member of the European Parliament (EP) for the populist Lithuanian Farmers and Greens Union. Jakeliūnas has previously spent one incomplete term as MP at the Lithuanian Seimas, having been elected in 2016.

Controversy

Jakeliūnas' election process roused accusations of electoral fraud. He was elected when Šarūnas Marčiulionis, a former basketball player with no political experience, won the EP seat for the party but instantly resigned and gave up his seat in favor of Jakeliūnas; it transpired Marčiulionis never intended to take his seat to start with.

In 2019 Jakeliūnas was accused by governor of central Bank of Lithuania of asking to apply pressure on the fintech Revolut to leave Lithuania.

In September 2020 Jakeliūnas abstained in the parliamentary vote on support for the 2020–2021 Belarusian protests, attracting criticism from prime minister Saulius Skvernelis of the Farmers and Greens Union.

In December 2021 Jakeliūnas was among 6 MEPs punished for entering the parliament building without Covid-19 certificates in contravention of the rules in November 2021 which earned him the distinction of being added to Politico European Parliament's black book.

In February 2022 Jakeliūnas abstained in the parliamentary vote on support to Ukraine during the 2022 Russian invasion of Ukraine. In his comments  to Lietuvos rytas he said that "support to Ukraine that does not take into account Russia's red lines is a danger to the entire world", "Russia is a nuclear state and cannot be won against", asked for consideration of Ukraine's "much closer historical, cultural, religious ties to Russia" than to Europe, and advocated neutrality for Ukraine. The Farmers and Greens Union distanced itself from Jakeliūnas position.

In November 2022 Jakeliūnas abstained in the parliamentary vote declaring Russia a state sponsor of terrorism that succeeded by a majority of 494 against 58, with 44 abstentions.

In February 2023 Jakeliūnas was interviewed by a Youtuber who had previously attracted attention in a public report from the State Security Department of Lithuania for his support for Russian propaganda, to whom he stated that questioning political status of Crimea was reminiscent of "fascistic methods" and proceeded to equate George W. Bush and Vladimir Putin as war criminals. Later same week he stated to LRT that Russia had been "partly provoked" to invade Ukraine.

Parliamentary career

Jakeliūnas initiated the impeachment process of Mykolas Majauskas.

History of frivolous litigation

In 2021 Lithuanian courts refused to accept Jakeliūnas' defamation lawsuit against Vitas Vasiliauskas, governor of the central Bank of Lithuania.

In 2021 General Court (European Union) declined to accept Jakeliūnas' lawsuit regarding alleged manipulation of the Vilibor interest rate.

In 2022 Lithuanian courts reiterated refusal to accept Jakeliūnas' lawsuit against the foreign minister Gabrielius Landsbergis regarding alleged intimidation of the Lithuanian Constitutional Court.

In 2022 Lithuanian courts reiterated their negative decision in Jakeliūnas' defamation lawsuit against Vitas Vasiliauskas.

References

Living people
MEPs for Lithuania 2019–2024
Lithuanian Farmers and Greens Union MEPs
Lithuanian Farmers and Greens Union politicians
1958 births